The Argeș is a river in Southern Romania, a left tributary of the Danube. Its source is in the Făgăraș Mountains, in the Southern Carpathians and it flows into the Danube at Oltenița.

The main city on the Argeș is Pitești. Upstream, it is retained by the Vidraru Dam, which has created Lake Vidraru. Its upper course, upstream of Lake Vidraru, is also called Capra.

Name
The river is believed to be the same as Ὀρδησσός Ordessus, a name mentioned by Ancient Greek historian Herodotus. The etymology of Argeș is not clear. Traditionally, it was considered that it is derived from the ancient name, through a reconstructed term, *Argessis. The capital of Dacian leader Burebista was named Argedava, but it appears that it has no link with the name for the river.

An alternate etymology derives the name of the river from a Pecheneg word, transliterated into Romanian as argiș (meaning "higher ground"). The earliest recorded variants of the name, referring to the city of Curtea de Argeș (lit. "The Court on the Argeș"), also suggest a derivation from this word: Argyas (1369), Argies (1379), Arghiș (1427), the river probably taking the name of the city.

Localities
The following localities are situated along the river Argeș, from source to mouth: Căpățânenii Ungureni, Căpățânenii Pământeni, Arefu, Poienarii de Argeș, Corbeni, Rotunda, Albeștii de Argeș, Curtea de Argeș, Băiculești, Merișani, Bascov, Pitești, Găești, Bolintin-Deal, Adunații-Copăceni, and Oltenița.

Hydro energy
The river Argeș and some of its tributaries are used for hydro energy. The hydroelectrical system consists of several dams, lakes, tunnels and power plants. The lakes built on the Argeș River are: Vidraru, Oiești, Cerbureni, Curtea de Argeș, Zigoneni, Merișani, Budeasa, Bascov, Pitești, Călinești (or Golești), Zăvoiu (near Mătăsaru), Ogrezeni and Mihăilești. There are dams also on its tributaries.

Tributaries
The following rivers are tributaries to the river Argeș (from source to mouth):
Left tributaries: Braia, Mândra, Buda, Valea cu Pești, Valea Lupului, Berindești, Valea Iașului, Sasu, Vâlsan, Râul Doamnei, Vrănești, Râncăciov, Cârcinov, Budișteanca, Sabar, Dâmbovița, Rasa, and Luica.
Right tributaries: Paltinul, Lespezi, Modrugaz, Cumpăna, Valea lui Stan, Arefu, Bănești (Cicănești), Valea Danului, Tutana, Schiau, Bascov and Neajlov.

See also
List of longest rivers of Romania
Battle of the Argeș

References

 
Rivers of Argeș County
Rivers of Dâmbovița County
Rivers of Ilfov County
Rivers of Giurgiu County
Rivers of Călărași County
Rivers of Romania
Tributaries of the Danube